Yi Gyubo (1168–1241) was a Korean scholar, literary critic, poet and writer of the Koryo period. Approximately 1,500-2,000 of his poems and numerous prose works survive. Korea didn't develop the hangul writing system until the 15th century; these earlier works were written using hanmun characters. The 13th century Collected Works of Minister Yi of Korea by Yi Kyubo is one of the earliest texts of a Korean writer commissioned by an official patron.

Background
Medieval Korean poetry was influenced by Chinese culture. In 1190 Yi Kyubo passed a State Civil Examination that the Koryo dynasty modeled on the Confucian traditions of the Tang Dynasty. He became the first privy counselor of the ruling Ch'oe family. Yi Kyubo fled to Kanghwa island during the Mongol invasions of Korea. As Korean peasants were left to the slaughter, Yi Kyubo composed poems describing their plight.

Yi Kyubo was one of the most important literary critics of his time, concerned with form theory (yongsa ron) and creative theory (shunui ron). His views diverged from those of Yi Illo, who rejected the notion of the importance of individual creativity in poetry. Although both held similar views, Yi Illo was more conservative and placed a greater emphasis on classical Chinese forms. value the use of an elegant or refined language.

Influence of Chinese poets
Modern Korean scholars have attributed Chinese influence in Yi Kyubo's writing to Bai Juyi (白居易), Tao Yuanming (陶淵明) and Su Dongpo (蘇東坡). Bai Juyi was one of the most influential Tang dynasty writers, even more influential than Li Bai and Du Fu. Although the Middle Tang era was four centuries before Yi Kyubo's time, imitation of Middle Tang literature continued to be commonplace in the Song Dynasty. Koryo envoys had acquired copies of two of the four major encyclopedic works compiled during the reign of the Song emperor Taizong, one of which was the Wenyuan yinghua (Finest Blossoms in the Garden of Literature). This work had intended to teach Song era writers how to compose poetry ad other literary works.

He wrote a poem about Tao Yuanming called Reading Tao Yuanming's Poems":
Tao Yuanming freed himself from official business:
he returned to the country,
to wander among pine, bamboo and chrysanthemum.
When he had no wine, he sought out a fried;
he fell down drunk every day.
On the sleeping bench he stretched his body out;
the breeze blew cool and refreshing.
From the bright ancient world he came,
a scholar noble and true.
I think of the man when I read the poems;
his integrity will be praised for a thousand years.

Yi Kyubo's works were heavily influenced by Su Dongpo, considered the greatest poet of the Northern Song of whom he wrote: "Dongpo was the greatest man of letters, towering over all others in modern times."

Works
Yi Kyubo wrote prose works in the kajon genre, "fictitious" biographies first popularized by Han Yu in the Tang dynasty. Along his works in this genre are the Tale of the Turtle in Clear Water and The Story of Mr. Yeast.The Lay of King Tongmyong'' may be Yi Kyubo's best known poem. The mythic tale of the founding of the Kingdom of Koguryo emphasized local Korean historical legends and cultural achievements. It is considered a nationalist rebuttal to Chinese-dominated historical traditions and Mongol political dominance.

References

12th-century Korean poets
Korean male poets
13th-century Korean poets